Lincoln County is a county located in the U.S. state of Idaho. As of the 2020 census, the population was 5,127. The county seat and largest city is Shoshone. The county is named after President Abraham Lincoln. The Idaho Territory was created in 1863, during the Lincoln Administration of 1861–65.

Lincoln County is included in the Hailey, ID Micropolitan Statistical Area.

Lincoln County was created by the Idaho Legislature on March 18, 1895, by a partitioning of Blaine County, which was created earlier that month by a merger of Alturas and Logan Counties. Lincoln County itself was partitioned on January 28, 1913, with a western portion becoming Gooding County and an eastern portion becoming Minidoka County. The county assumed its present borders on February 8, 1919, when a southern portion became Jerome County.

Geography

Adjacent counties
 Camas County - northwest
 Blaine County - north
 Minidoka County - east
 Jerome County - south
 Gooding County - west

Major highways
 US 26
 US 93
 SH-24
 SH-75 - Sawtooth Scenic Byway

National protected area
Craters of the Moon National Monument and Preserve - (part)

Demographics

2000 census
As of the census of 2000, there were 4,044 people, 1,447 households, and 1,050 families living in the county.  The population density was 3 people per square mile (1/km2).  There were 1,651 housing units at an average density of 1 per square mile (1/km2).  The racial makeup of the county was 86.47% White, 0.47% Black or African American, 1.21% Native American, 0.45% Asian, 0.05% Pacific Islander, 9.42% from other races, and 1.93% from two or more races.  13.40% of the population were Hispanic or Latino of any race. 16.8% were of English, 12.4% American, 11.5% German and 8.3% Irish ancestry.

There were 1,447 households, out of which 37.70% had children under the age of 18 living with them, 61.50% were married couples living together, 5.50% had a female householder with no husband present, and 27.40% were non-families. 22.90% of all households were made up of individuals, and 10.20% had someone living alone who was 65 years of age or older.  The average household size was 2.77 and the average family size was 3.27.

In the county, the population was spread out, with 30.40% under the age of 18, 9.00% from 18 to 24, 25.50% from 25 to 44, 22.00% from 45 to 64, and 13.10% who were 65 years of age or older.  The median age was 34 years.  For every 100 females there were 106.50 males.  For every 100 females age 18 and over, there were 105.80 males.

The median income for a household in the county was $32,484, and the median income for a family was $36,792. Males had a median income of $26,576 versus $20,032 for females. The per capita income for the county was $14,257.  13.10% of the population and 10.80% of families were below the poverty line.  Out of the total population, 18.30% of those under the age of 18 and 7.00% of those 65 and older were living below the poverty line.

2010 census
As of the 2010 United States Census, there were 5,208 people, 1,705 households, and 1,271 families living in the county. The racial makeup of the county was 80.1% white, 0.7% American Indian, 0.4% black or African American, 0.4% Asian, 0.1% Pacific islander, 16.2% from other races, and 2.2% from two or more races. Those of Hispanic or Latino origin made up 28.3% of the population. In terms of ancestry, 21.2% were German, 17.3% were English, 6.9% were Irish, and 6.1% were American.

Of the 1,705 households, 43.4% had children under the age of 18 living with them, 60.8% were married couples living together, 7.1% had a female householder with no husband present, 25.5% were non-families, and 20.5% of all households were made up of individuals. The average household size was 3.03 and the average family size was 3.52. The median age was 32.0 years.

The median income for a household in the county was $45,714 and the median income for a family was $50,543. Males had a median income of $37,639 versus $30,080 for females. The per capita income for the county was $19,011. About 10.9% of families and 15.3% of the population were below the poverty line, including 19.4% of those under age 18 and 25.0% of those age 65 or over.

2020 census 
As of the 2020 United States Census, there were 5,127 people and 1,804 households living in the county. The population density was 4.3 inhabitants per square mile, or 4.3 inhabitants per 1.7 square kilometers.

Communities

Cities
Dietrich
Richfield
Shoshone

Unincorporated community
Hidden Valley

Politics

See also
National Register of Historic Places listings in Lincoln County, Idaho

References

 

 
Idaho counties
Populated places established in 1895
1895 establishments in Idaho